Kellie McMillan Snowdon (born 29 December 1977 in Warrnambool, Victoria, Australia) is a former Australian backstroke swimmer.

McMillan won back-to-back bronze in the 50m backstroke event at the 1999 and 2000 Short Course Worlds.

As of June 2010, she is now Kellie Snowdon and she is the CEO of Swimming Victoria, one of the state associations of Swimming Australia. Previously, she had served as their Education and Training Coordinator.

References 

1977 births
Living people
People from Warrnambool
Australian female backstroke swimmers
Medalists at the FINA World Swimming Championships (25 m)